Gilău may refer to:

 Gilău, Cluj, a commune in Cluj County, Romania
 Gilău Mountains, a portion of the Bihor Massif, a mountain range in the Apuseni Mountains in Transylvania, Romania, belonging  to the Western Romanian Carpathians